The Computerised National Identity Card (CNIC4520108814061

) is an identity card issued by Pakistan's National Database and Registration Authority (NADRA). The card is available to any citizen of Pakistan who is 18 years of age or older. The CNIC is a computerised version of the National Identity Card (NIC4520108814061).

History 

Pakistan initiated its National Identity Card System in 1973 under Article 30 of the Second Amendment. The card was issued manually in a hand-written paper form by the Directorate General of Registration (DGR) with the first NIC being that of Zulfiqar Ali Bhutto, the Prime Minister of the time. The country moved to a Computerised National Identity Card (CNIC) in 2000 after the formation of National Database & Registration Authority (NADRA). The CNIC issuance required the applicant to provide the state with digital fingerprint biometrics. and thus set the stage for the first citizen data warehouse in the country. NADRA subsequently launched the Smart National Identity Card (SNIC) in 2012 which is a chip-based ID card with transliteration of cardholders bio-data to English.

Requirement 

In Pakistan, all adult citizens must register for the Computerised National Identity Card (CNIC) with a unique number upon reaching the age of 18. It serves as an identification document to authenticate an individual's identity as the citizen of Pakistan. Before introduction of the CNIC, manual National Identity Cards (NICs) were issued to citizens of Pakistan. Today, the Government has shifted all its existing records of National Identity Cards (NIC) to the central computerised database managed by NADRA. New CNIC's are machine-readable and carry facial and fingerprint information.

Every citizen is required to have a NIC number, and the number is required for many activities such as voting in elections, getting a driver licence or passport, registering a vehicle, receiving social insurance/Zakat funding, enrolling in school, college or technical institute, filing a legal affidavit, wiring funds, paying taxes, opening a bank account, getting a utility connection (electricity, phone, mobile phone, water and sewer, natural gas), entering into marriage/getting a divorce etc. Thus, it can be seen as a de facto necessity for meaningful civic life in Pakistan. However, since some births in the country are not registered, and some Pakistanis do not conduct any of the activities described above, a few do not have ID cards. In 2007, NADRA announced that it had issued 60 million CNIC (the C standing for computerised) numbers, which is approximately one-third of the population. The authority had issued the 10 millionth CNIC on February 11, 2002; 20 millionth on June 18, 2002; 30 millionth on December 22, 2003; 40 millionth on October 1, 2004; and 50 millionth CNIC on February 14, 2006.

Security features 
A unique 13-digit number are assigned at birth when the legal ascendant(s) complete the child's birth registration form (Form RG-2, commonly known as B-Form), and then a National Identity Card (NIC) with the same number is issued at the age of 18. Until 2001, NIC numbers were 11 digits long. In 2001-2002, the authority started issuing 13-digit NIC numbers along with their new biometric ID cards. The first 5 digits are based on the applicant's locality, the next 7 are serial numbers, and the last digit is a check digit. The old manual NIC numbers are invalid as of 1 January 2004.

The ID card has the following information on it: Legal Name, Gender (male, female, or transgender), Father's name (Husband's name for married females), Identification Mark, Date of Birth, National Identity Card Number, Family Tree ID Number, Current Address, Permanent Address, Date of Issue, Date of Expiry, Signature, Photo, and Fingerprint (Thumbprint) NADRA also records the applicant's religion, but this is not noted on the CNIC itself. NADRA has registered over 90% of women in the Pakistani nation.

In Pakistan, all adult citizens must register for the Computerised National Identity Card (CNIC), with a unique number, at age 18. CNIC serves as an identification document to authenticate an individual's identity as the citizen of Pakistan. Before introduction of the CNIC, National Identity Cards (NICs) were issued to citizens of Pakistan. Now, government has introduced the Smart National Identity Card (SNIC),

Smart National Identity Card 
NADRA introduced the Smart National Identity Card (SNIC), Pakistan's first national electronic identity card, in October 2012. Pakistan's SNIC contains a data chip and 36 security features. The SNIC complies with ICAO standard 9303 and ISO standard 7816-4. The SNIC can be used for both offline and online identification, voting, pension disbursement, social and financial inclusion programmes and other services. NADRA aims to replace all 89.5 million CNICs with SNICs by 2020. It costs PKR 750 to get a SNIC as on 15 - December - 2019.

Contents
The SNIC card contains basic information regarding the individual, such as the following.

Front side

	Name – Given Name, Family Name in English and Urdu.
	Father’s Name – Given Name, Family Name in English and Urdu. (Husband's name for married females)
	Gender – containing one character for M (male), F (female), or X (transgender) 
	Country of Stay  
	Identity number – A unique 13-digit number
	Date of birth – listed in the Gregorian calendar format, in DDMMYY
	Photo of the individual
	Date of Issue
	Date of Expiry (written as Till Death for above 60 year old)
	Holder’s Signature

Back side
       Present address
       Permanent address
       QR code
       Card serial number
       Card holder's name→ is entitled visa free entry into Pakistan. (NICOP and POC only) 
       Machine-readable data (NICOP and POC only)

Features 
In order to address the security concerns, NADRA have incorporated 36 security features in the physical design of the card, making it one of the securest cards in the world. The card is printed in multiple layers and each layer has its own security features. The chip is encrypted with algorithm developed by NADRA indigenous development team and secure communication protocols have been determined for being read by remote devices.

To enable remote verification of citizens a match-on-card applet has been designed by NADRA. When a citizen places their card into a card reader, the reader will first authenticate itself to the card. In return, the card will verify its authenticity to the reader. If both the verifications are successful, the device will ask for a finger. This will enable verifications of individuals in the remotest parts of Pakistan. So say in a decade when an individual casts vote, the government may ascertain that the person casting the vote is indeed the same as the one on the electoral roll. This is only one of the thousands of scenarios of identity fraud prevention that the card empowers. These kind of contemporary features help gain citizen a new level of technology.

Majority of space in the chip has been made available for the private sector to use for their products and services. It might appear expensive for the private sector to use this card initially but once the number of citizens having critical mass is reached, it will be more profitable for the private sector to use this secure and universal platform.

Citizens who live abroad
Pakistani citizens living abroad can apply for NICOP.  NICOP stands for  National Identity Card for Overseas Pakistanis. NICOP is a registration document to be issued to a valid/legitimate citizen of Pakistan. Previously it was issued to overseas Pakistanis working/living/staying/studying abroad for consecutive time period of six months or possessing dual nationalities but now it can be issued to any citizen of Pakistan. Persons with a fiduciary claim to Pakistan e.g. by marriage to a CNIC, SNIC, or NICOP holder can apply for POC, Pakistan Origin Card. Like NICOP, POC entitles the holder to visa-free entry to Pakistan with unlimited length of stay.

Controversy
In 2017 it had come to light that a non-Pakistani, Chinese citizen, was able to lawfully obtain a National ID Card and speculations whether the fact that Pakistan being part of CPEC had anything to do with it arose, thus sparking a row in Pakistan.

References

External links
 CNIC at NADRA

Pakistan
Pakistani nationality law